Plagiorchiidae is a family of parasitic trematodes (flukes) in the order Plagiorchiida.

References 

 
Trematode families